Sofi Mkheyan (born April 8, 1984) is an Armenian singer and the winner of Best Newcomer award at the Armenian National Music Awards in Yerevan in 2005.

Early life
Mkheyan was born in Yerevan, the daughter of Parliament member Gagik Mkheyan, who previously served as the Vice President of Orinats Yerkir. She has one brother, Gor. She started singing at the Doremi Vocal Studio and later Sayat Music School and Romanos Melikyan Musical College; all three are in Yerevan. She then attended Komitas State Conservatory of Yerevan.

Career
Mkheyan won the Best Newcomer award at the Armenian National Music Awards in 2005; Best Modern Pop Female in 2009; and Best Female Singer in 2010.

As of 2022, she has released 4 albums: Kyanke Qo, Luys Khavarum,  2012, and The Best of Sofi Mkheyan, as well as a number of singles. DerHova is a frequent producer and she has collaborated with singers such as Sirusho and Vigen Hovsepyan. In 2007, "Ore Yev Nerkan", a single later added to Kyange Qo, won the Hit of the Year award in 2007 at the Armenian National Music Awards. She made a music video for Hayastani erge (Armenia's Song), her first patriotic song, in 2012; the video was filmed in both Armenia and Nagorno-Karabakh.

She judged and coached for The Voice of Armenia between 2012 and 2017; fellow judges included Arame, Nune Yesayan, and Sevak Khanagyan.

Personal life
She is politically active and patriotic. In 2020, she participated in a protest against Prime Minister Nikol Pashinyan's decision to sign a peace treaty over the conflict for the Nagorno-Karabakh area.

Discography

Albums

Singles

References

21st-century Armenian women singers
1984 births
Living people
Place of birth missing (living people)